Sergio Horacio Egea Rueda (born 21 September 1957) is a retired Argentine footballer who played as a central defender, and is a manager of Spanish Salamanca CF UDS.

Playing career
Born in Necochea, Egea graduated from Estudiantes de La Plata's youth setup, after a stint with Cruz de Necochea. He made his debuts as a senior with South Africa's Lusitano FC, before moving to Spain.

In Spain, Egea represented Hércules CF B, Elche CF, Recreativo de Huelva, UD Barbastro, Orihuela Deportiva CF and Novelda CF, retiring with the latter in 1989.

Managerial career
Immediately after retiring Egea took up coaching, starting with UDF Sax. In 1995, he was appointed Real Madrid Castilla manager, leading the club to fourth position during his first season.

After another stint at CD Toledo, Hércules CF and Real Valladolid B, Egea started working with Hugo Sánchez, being his assistant at Pumas UNAM, Club Necaxa, the Mexico national football team and UD Almería, only leaving in 2009.

On 23 April 2012 Egea was named Estudiantes de Altamira manager. He was sacked on 4 March of the following year, after a 0–2 home defeat against Lobos de la BUAP.

On 13 February 2014 Egea returned to Spain, being appointed at the helm of CD Eldense. After winning promotion from Tercera División with the side, he was named Real Oviedo manager on 6 July.

On 13 June 2015, after being crowned champions of Segunda División B and taking the side back to Segunda División after a 12-year absence, Egea renewed his contract with the Asturians for a further year. On 14 March of the following year, despite his side being third-placed, he resigned alleging "personal reasons".

On 23 August 2017, Egea was named interim manager of Pumas UNAM, but stepped down in October. On 22 April 2019, he returned to Oviedo in the place of departed Juan Antonio Anquela, but was dismissed on 15 September after only one point in the five matches of the new season.

Personal life
Egea's sons, Lauren and Alexis, are both also footballers. The former is a forward, while the latter is also a defender.

Managerial statistics

Honours
Segunda División B: 2014–15
Segunda División Manager of the Month: December 2015

References

External links

1957 births
Living people
Sportspeople from Buenos Aires Province
Argentine footballers
Association football defenders
Segunda División players
Segunda División B players
Tercera División players
Hércules CF B players
Deportivo de La Coruña players
Elche CF players
Recreativo de Huelva players
Orihuela Deportiva CF footballers
UD Barbastro players
Lusitano F.C. (South Africa) players
Argentine expatriate footballers
Expatriate football managers in Spain
Expatriate soccer players in South Africa
Argentine expatriate sportspeople in South Africa
Argentine expatriate sportspeople in Spain
Expatriate footballers in Spain
Argentine football managers
Segunda División managers
Real Madrid Castilla managers
CD Toledo managers
Hércules CF managers
Real Oviedo managers
Club Xelajú MC managers
Salamanca CF UDS managers